Neil Randall David, Sr. Is a Hopi-Tewa American Indian artist and katsina carver. He learned the basics of carving from his grandfather Victor (Kawayo) Charlie.

Early life 
David was born June 4, 1944, on the Hopi Reservation in Polacca, Arizona. His father died before David was six years old.

Under the influence and guidance of Victor Charlie, a katsina carver, and his wife, a potter, Lena (Blue Corn) Charlie, David’s interest in art was stimulated at an early age. His grandparents were invited to exhibit their art at the Santa Fe Indian Village pavilion at the Railroad Fair in Chicago in 1948. The following year they brought their grandson, 5 ½ year old David, along with them. David was self-taught as an artist. His art teacher in eighth grade was Fred Kabotie. After graduation, David attended High school in distant Phoenix. He sold his first Kachina doll while a high school freshman to Byron Hunter, who managed the trading store in Polacca. He saw the young man’s talent in art and as his mentor encouraged him. Hunter bought many of David’s drawings, paintings, and Kachina carvings and sold them through McGee’s trading store.

Career 
David was drafted into the US Army in 1965 and served in Germany until 1968. When he returned home he began painting and carving full time. David received national recognition when his paintings and Kachina doll carvings were given multiple page coverage in the Arizona Highways magazine of June 1971, a reference issue devoted entirely to the Kachinas, the Living Spirits of the Hopi. A group of Hopi artists, the Artist Hopid, was organized in 1972 by Michael Kabotie, Terrance Talaswayma, and Neil David Sr. Their objectives included the use of their artistic talents to instill pride and identity in the Hopi, to educate Indian and non-Indian to the cultural values of the Hopi, and document Hopi history and events through the visual arts. In 1974 and 1975 the expanded membership of six exhibited at the Heard Museum in Phoenix; the Tucson Art Center; Riverside Community College in Riverside, California; Museum of Man in San Diego; Taylor Art Museum in Colorado Springs; and the Flagstaff Art Museum. In 1976 the National Endowment for the Arts and the Arizona Commission on the Arts provided a grant sending thirty-one of the groups paintings on a tour across the country. Patricia Broder’s Hopi Painting includes biographical essays of the Artist Hopid and details their exhibits and achievements.

David’s inseparable commingling of art and dedication to his Hopi culture give a rare opportunity to view elements of Hopi life without intruding on the society itself. His insight into his culture, and ability to capture realistic views of Hopi life, ceremonies, and dramatic Kachina dances on canvas and with his Kachina doll carvings have brought him wide acclaim and support for calling him “the Hopis’ Norman Rockwell.” David's informative paintings range from the Hopis' Kachina Fest Parade, a depiction of a great variety of Kachinas parading through the village to the Hopis' Comanche Dance centering on Comanche Warrior impersonators and the Koshare, to the non-Kachina Hopi Scalp Dancers. David is internationally recognized for his drawings and carvings of his icon the Koshare, (Tewa or Hano) clown. He speaks through the antics of his clown drawings, and is associated with the Koshare to a level summarized in a telephone conversation between author Zena Pearlstone and Neil David and published in the "About Face" book as part of plate 48: “I along with my patrons see me as associated—even infatuated—with this clown [Koshare], which is the subject of so much of my work.” Two of David’s paintings were selected for the "About Face: Self-portraits by Native American, First Nations, and Inuit Artists" exhibit held at the Wheelwright Museum in Santa Fe, New Mexico which was held from November 2005 through April 2006. Both paintings feature his signature piece, the Koshare as central to the topic along with David. The authors/guest curators of the exhibit and publications closing comments (on page 42) were: "the thought-provoking Hopi Triple Self-Portrait, by artist Neil David Sr., which, we have come to think of as the signature image for this project, so many avenues does it explore." David lives and continues to create his painting and carving on the Hopi Reservation in Polacca on First Mesa, Arizona.

Illustrations 
The original set of 79 paintings by Neil David, on which the book Kachinas, Spirit Beings of the Hopisee page 11 is based, are now in the collection of Dr. Yasutada Kashiwago, Founder of the Kashiwagi Museum in Tateshina, Nagano, Japan.

David produced all the illustrations in Eric Bromberg’s book The Hopi Approach to the Art of Kachina Doll Carvings. Neil David’s Hopi World published by Schiffer Publishing Ltd., is a collection of over 40 of Neil David’s pen and ink drawings of his interpretation of Hopi history and culture.

Recognition 
David was awarded the Arizona Indian Living Treasures AILTA award in 2005. AILTA honors the lifetime achievements of Arizona American Indians.

In November 2013 David was invited to present a series of talks and exhibit his work in Germany. This included visits to the Linden Museum in Stuttgart, the Freiberg Natural History Museum, and Galerie Kokopelli in Mönchengladbach. A documentary film titled: Neil David Sr., A Smiling Hopi, was shown at the Fifth Annual Indian Inuit; North American Native Film Festival which took place in Stuttgart, Germany January 2014. The festival was organized by UNICEF, American Indian Film Institute and Festival in San Francisco, and Dreamspeakers International Indigenous Film Festival Edmonton, Canada.

Published work

Notes

References

 Bassman, Theda. Hopi Kachina Dolls and their Carvers. Schiffer Publishing Ltd.1991; pp 40–45.
 Bassman, Theda. Treasures of the Hopi. Northland Publishing, 1997. . pp 64–65.
 Broder, Patricia J. Hopi Painting, the World of the Hopi. Brandywine Press. 1978. pp299–304.
 Bromberg, Eric. The Hopi Approach to the Art of Kachina Doll Carving. Schiffer Publishing Ltd., 1986 
 David Sr., Neil. and Anthony, A. and Ricks, B. Kachinas: Spirit Beings of the Hopi. Avanyu Publishing. 1991.  (Collection of 79 Kachina paintings by Neil David Sr.)
 Jacka, Lois. Beyond Tradition: Contemporary Indian Art and its Evolution. Northland Publishing.1988.
 Jacka, L and Jacka J. Art of the Hopi. Northland Publishing. 1998.
 Pearlstone, Zena. Katsina: Commodified and Appropriated Images of Hopi Supernaturals, UCLA Fowler Museum of Cultural History. 2001, . Pp 34-35.
 Pearlstone, Zena and Ryan, Allan. About Face Self-Portraits by Native American, First Nations, and Inuit Artists. Wheelwright Museum, Santa Fe, New Mexico. 2006, .
 Pecina, Ron and Pecina, Bob; Art by Neil David. Neil David’s Hopi World. Schiffer Publishing Ltd., 2011. .
 Pecina, Ron and Pecina, Bob. Hopi Kachinas: History, Legends, and Art. Schiffer Publishing Ltd., 2013. ;  pp 124-146.
 Teiwes, Helga. Kachina Dolls. University of Arizona Press. 1991.  Pp. 50, 114-117.

Periodicals:
 Living Spirits of Kachinas; Arizona Highways, June 1971.
 The New Individualists; Arizona Highways, May 1986. pp16,45.
 Pecina, Ron. Painter and Kachina doll Carver, Neil David Sr., Native Artists Magazine, Fall 1999 Pp26-29.
 Bulow, Ernie. Master Artist Neil David Hopi-Tewa Living Treasure. Indian Trader, May 2012, pp12–13.
 Native Peoples Magazine Mar/Apr 2013, p16.
 Indian Trader; Neil David featured in Native American Film Festival; January 2014, p22.
 Pecina, Ron. Wrapper Art.'' Indian Trader, Dec. 2014 pp15,17.

External links 
Artist Hopid
 A significant number of Neil David’s paintings are pictured and reviewed by Broder as part of the Artist Hopid’s interpretation of Hopi life and culture.
“Closing Thoughts”, signature image of the Wheelwright Museum Self-Portraits exhibit is Norman Rockwell’s self-portrait reworked in Neil David’s Hopi Triple Self-Portrait, pp. 42-43.
Hopis’ Norman Rockwell p. 143
Linden Museum, Stuttgart—workshop 

1944 births
Living people
Hopi-Tewa people
Native American male artists
Native American woodcarvers
20th-century Native Americans
21st-century Native Americans